Bely Kolodez is a rural locality (a selo) and the administrative center of Belokolodezyanskoye Rural Settlement, Shebekinsky District, Belgorod Oblast, Russia. The population was 420 as of 2010. There are 5 streets.

Geography 
Bely Kolodez is located 52 km northeast of Shebekino (the district's administrative centre) by road. Artelnoye is the nearest rural locality.

References 

Rural localities in Shebekinsky District